Cuidado con lo que deseas is a 2020 Mexican horror thriller film written and directed by Agustin Tapia. It was produced by Leonardo Zimbron, Agustin Tapia and Diego Gallangos. It follows a family on a weekend vacation to celebrate their child's eighth birthday. When she receives a jester doll as a gift, it exposes their darkest secret desires.

It was a box-office success in Mexico, but critics found fault with its plot and "confusing" writing.

Plot 
Pamela, a seven-year-old girl and horror film fan, is taken by her parents, Nuria and Bernardo, to her family's cabin in the woods to celebrate her eight birthday. Norberto's youngest brother Esteban joins them as well, even though he has a rivalry with him. Once there Pam finds Sebastian's gift: a jester puppet doll named Hellequin who according to her uncle; it is based on a real jester who was hanged when he failed to amuse his King.

That night Nuria and Esteban meet at the Shack' shed as they are living an affair and have sex, they plot against Bernardo as Esteban plans killing his eldest brother at the family's boat with a manipulated pole so he can report it as an accident. Meanwhile, at Pam's bedroom she is awakened by a living Hellequin who shows her with a puppet theatre and other puppets: her uncle and mother' secret affair and plan of killing her father. Even though Pam tries to warn their family of the situation, Hellequin stops her, claiming if she does he will take their souls to Hell.

Due Nuria and Esteban plan, the family celebrate a private party for Pam (so they can eventually kill off Bernardo with no witnesses) however Pam tries to warn her family anyway so she plays a puppet 's play of a king betrayed by his wife and sings songs to both Bernardo and Esteban with clues of their hideous plans. Hellequin reveals to Pam her parents actually are pretending to be on Esteban side and they have their own plan for killing him at the tools shed as Esteban began to suspect his plan's success and discovers part of Hellequin background might be true in a book where it is revealed his soul was trapped inside the doll by a wizard.

On their last day of the weekend; Esteban and Bernardo get ready for killing each other; Esteban apparently kills his brother when his plan of hitting Bernardo in the head with a pole is successful. However, when he and Nuria go to the shed they are ambushed by Bernardo who protects himself with a hidden helmet and tries to kill him with a shotgun. His plan backfires as Nuria disassembles the munitions forcing both brothers to confront each other with an axe and a rake in a violent battle where Bernardo kills Esteban with the rake. Bernardo tries to kill Nuria as well as she is not trustworthy but he is killed by his wife when he chases her through the wood until he falls for a bear trap and is beaten to death with the shotgun. Pam learns everything thanks to Hellequin who shows her once again what the adults do with his puppets.

Days later Nuria inherits from her husband and brother in law family company by nepotism as she planned and Pam apparently is severely shocked for Bernardo's death. Nonetheless, Nuria is killed by Pam who makes her fall from the stairs with a rope, presumably as an influence of Hellequin or either revenge.

Production

Writing 
The film was written and directed by Agustin Tapia who was inspired by crimes stories from Agatha Christie and thrillers films and TV shows like Alfred Hitchcock films and The Twilight Zone episodes. Tapia wrote the film as a mystery drama with some takes from fantasy and psychological manipulation in order of make people believe either any character could be the villain or if the doll might be alive or not.

Filming 
The principal photography took place in Valle Bravo y El Ajusco from Mexico City for outdoors scenes and most part of the movie. Filming concluded in earlier 2020 as the original premiere date was in April 2020 before being delayed due to the COVID-19 pandemic in Mexico.

Reception

Box office 
The film premiered in Mexico on August 20, 2020, and it was the third most successful film during its opening weekend. It was one of the first films projected during theaters reopenings in Mexico. It grossed a total of 438,728 pesos for its domestic box office and worldwide.

The film was eventually distributed by Netflix in December 2020; becoming one of the most watched films in the same month.

Critics 
The film was met with mostly mixed to negative reviews.

Jose Roberto Landaverde from CinePremiere gave it 3.5 stars out of 5 in a positive review calling the film a waste of creative obsessions that keeps the best of everything it explores, writing: "From terror to thriller going through true crime; this is a fresh take from admiration's ditch".

Conversely Javier Quintanar Polanco from Tomatazos graded as "disappointing", specially for its plot and narrative that were not on the same level of other productions values, concluiding: "Efforts for trying to boost and conceive national productions that not only try to bring quality standards in order to compete with romantic comedies but also with a view to an international market are recognized. With a quality of production it is possible to some extent. By now it's necessary to envisage stable structures and appealing plots that should be executed for a disciplined direction and policy making for profits of movies."

References

External links 
 

2020 films
2020 horror thriller films
Mexican horror thriller films
Films set in Mexico